Zhang Ao (Chinese: 张奥; Pinyin: Zhāng Ào; born 16 January 1991) is a Chinese football player who currently plays for China League One side Xinjiang Tianshan Leopard.

Club career
Zhang joined Changsha Ginde youth team system in the early year and was promoted to first team squad in 2010. He made his senior debut on 24 July 2010, in a 4–1 away defeat against Shandong Luneng Taishan. He played four matches in the 2010 league season, as Changsha Ginde finished the bottom of the league and relegation to China League One. In February 2011, the club moved to Shenzhen as the club's name changed into Shenzhen Phoenix, Zhang chose to stay in the club. The club were then bought by Chinese property developers Guangzhou R&F and moved to Guangzhou in June 2011 and won promotion back to the Super League at the first attempt. Zhang made 11 league appearances in the season.

On 2 March 2018, Zhang transferred to China League Two side Hainan Boying. The next season he joined second tier football club Xinjiang Tianshan Leopard and would go on to make his debut on 9 March 2019 in a league game against Guangdong South China Tiger F.C. that ended in a 2-0 defeat. This would be followed by his first goal for the club in a league game on 27 July 2019 against Nantong Zhiyun in a 2-2 draw.

Career statistics 
Statistics accurate as of match played 31 December 2020.

References

External links

1991 births
Living people
Chinese footballers
Association football defenders
Sportspeople from Taiyuan
Footballers from Shanxi
Changsha Ginde players
Guangzhou City F.C. players
Hebei F.C. players
Xinjiang Tianshan Leopard F.C. players
Chinese Super League players
China League One players
China League Two players